The 1946 René le Bègue Cup was a Grand Prix motor race held in Paris on 6 June 1946.

Classification

Rene le Begue Cup
Rene le Begue Cup
Grand Prix race reports